Elections to the Adur District Council were held on 3 May 1990, with one third of the council up for election, as well as vacancies in the Churchill and Manor wards. No elections were held for the single-member St Mary's ward. The sitting Resident councillor in Overall turnout jumped to 49.8%.

The election resulted in the Social and Liberal Democrats retaining control of the council.

Election result

This resulted in the following composition of the council:

Ward results

References

1990
1990 English local elections
1990s in West Sussex